Qingjian County is a county in the north of Shaanxi province, China, bordering Shanxi province across the Yellow River to the east. It is under the administration of the prefecture-level city of Yulin.

Administrative divisions
As 2019, Qingjian County is divided to 9 towns.
Towns

Climate

Transportation
China National Highway 210
Shenmu–Yan'an Railway

References

County-level divisions of Shaanxi
Yulin, Shaanxi